The absolutely maximally entangled (AME) state is a concept in quantum information science, which has many applications in quantum error-correcting code, discrete AdS/CFT correspondence, AdS/CMT correspondence, and more. It is the multipartite generalization of the bipartite maximally entangled state.

Definition 
The bipartite maximally entangled state  is the one for which the reduced density operators are maximally mixed, i.e., . Typical examples are Bell states.

Property 
The AME state does not always exist; in some given local dimension and number of parties, there is no AME state. There is a list of AME states in low dimensions created by Huber and Wyderka.

The existence of the AME state can be transformed  into the existence of the solution for a specific quantum marginal problem.

The AME can also be used to build a kind of quantum error-correcting code called holographic error-correcting code.

References 

Quantum information science